Saturday Night Live is an American late-night live television variety show.

Saturday Night Live may also refer to:

Adaptations of the American television show
 Saturday Night Live Japan, a Japanese-language adaptation 2012
 Saturday Night Live Korea, a South Korean adaptation on channel tvN
 Saturday Night Live from Milano, an Italian adaptation 2006–2011
 Saturday Night Live (Spanish TV series), a Spanish-language adaptation 2009
 Saturday Night Live bil Arabi, an Egyptian-language adaptation 2016–2018
 Le Saturday Night Live, a French adaptation on the channel M6
 SNL Québec, a French-language Canadian adaptation 2014–2015

Other uses
 Saturday Night Live with Howard Cosell, a comedy-variety program on the channel ABC 1975–76
 Saturday Night Live (album), by Trouble Funk, 1983
 Saturday Night Live (UK), a spin-off of Big Brother
 Saturday Night Live, a successor of Australian show The Penthouse Club

See also
SNL (disambiguation)
 Saturday Live (British TV programme), 1985–1988 and 1996
List of Saturday Night Live cast members
List of Saturday Night Live writers
List of Saturday Night Live guests
List of Saturday Night Live episodes
List of Saturday Night Live incidents
List of Saturday Night Live home video releases
List of Saturday Night Live feature films
List of awards and nominations received by Saturday Night Live
 Saturday Night Live in the 2000s, a documentary
Saturday Night Live Weekend Update Thursday
SNL Studios, former production company
Saturday Night Live Band
 SNL Digital Short, one in a series of video shorts created for Saturday Night Live.